ʿArsh is a sub-district located in the Al-Misrakh District, Taiz Governorate, Yemen. ʿArsh had a population of 9,569 according to the 2004 census.

References  

Arsh